Neptis anjana, the rich sailer, is a species of nymphalid butterfly found in Asia.

Subspecies
Neptis anjana anjana (central and southern Burma)
Neptis anjana hyria Fruhstorfer, 1913 (Peninsular Malaya, Sumatra)
Neptis anjana decerna Fruhstorfer, 1908 (south-eastern Borneo)
Neptis anjana elegantia Fruhstorfer, 1908 (northern Borneo)
Neptis anjana zena Fruhstorfer, 1905 (Java)
Neptis anjana saskia Fruhstorfer, 1900 (Nias)
Neptis anjana vidua Staudinger, 1889 (the Philippines (Palawan))

References

anjana
Butterflies of Borneo
Butterflies of Java
Butterflies of Indochina
Butterflies described in 1881